The 1962 United States Senate election in Alabama was held on November 6, 1962 to elect one of Alabama's members to the United States Senate. Incumbent Democratic U.S. Senator J. Lister Hill won re-election to his fifth, and last, full term.

Background
In 1962, Hill, a pro-Labor New Deal liberal, sought his last term in office but faced an unusually strong Republican opponent in James D. Martin, a petroleum products distributor from Gadsden. Like Hill, Martin supported the Tennessee Valley Authority, a New Deal project begun in 1933. Martin noted that the original sponsor of the inter-state development agency was a Republican U.S. senator, George W. Norris of Nebraska. Martin proposed in the campaign that the TVA headquarters be relocated from Knoxville, Tennessee, to its original point of development, Muscle Shoals, Alabama. Hill had worked to fund other public works projects too, including the deepening of the Mobile Ship Channel, the building of the Gainesville Lock and Dam in Sumter County, and the Tennessee-Tombigbee Waterway, an ultimately successful strategy to link the Tennessee River with the Gulf of Mexico. In the campaign against Martin, Hill said, "If Alabama is to continue the progress and development she has achieved, she cannot do so by deserting the great Democratic Party of Franklin Roosevelt."
 
Senator Hill pledged to seek renewed funding for the Redstone Arsenal and Marshall Space Flight Center in Huntsville, Alabama, and accused Eisenhower of having neglected the space program while the former Soviet Union was placing Sputnik into the atmosphere. Strongly endorsed by organized labor, Hill accused the GOP of exploiting the South to enrich the North and the East and attacked the legacy of former President Herbert C. Hoover and the earlier "evils" of Reconstruction. Hill predicted that Alabama voters would bury the Republicans "under an avalanche."

The 1962 mid-term elections were overshadowed by the Cuban Missile Crisis. Martin joined Hill in endorsing the quarantine of Cuba but  insisted that the problem was an outgrowth of the failed Bay of Pigs Invasion of 1961. Hill said that Soviet premier, Nikita S. Khrushchev, had "chickened out" because "the one thing the communists respect is strength." The New York Times speculated that the blockade ordered by Kennedy may have spared Hill from defeat.

Despite the postwar bipartisan consensus for foreign aid, Martin hammered away at Hill's backing for such programs. He decried subsidies to foreign manufacturers  and workers at the expense of Alabama's then large force of textile workers: "These foreign giveaways have cost taxpayers billions of dollars and turned many areas of Alabama into distressed areas." Martin also condemned aid to communist countries and the impact of the United Nations on national policy. He questioned Hill's congressional seniority as of little use when troops were dispatched in the fall of 1962 to compel the desegregation of the University of Mississippi.

The Hill-Martin race drew considerable national attention. The liberal columnist Drew Pearson wrote from Decatur, Alabama, that "for the first time since Reconstruction, the two-party system, which political scientists talk about for the South, but never expect to materialize, may come to Alabama."The New York Times viewed the Alabama race as the most vigorous off-year effort in modern southern history but predicted a Hill victory on the basis that Martin had failed to gauge "bread-and-butter" issues and was perceived by many as an "ultraconservative."

Democratic primary

Candidates
J. Lister Hill, incumbent U.S. Senator
Donald Gunter Hallmark
John G. Crommelin, naval officer and white supremacist

Results

Republican primary

Candidates
James D. Martin, businessman

Results
James D. Martin ran unopposed in the Republican Primary.

General election

Candidates
J. Lister Hill (D), incumbent U.S. Senator
James D. Martin (R), businessman

Results

Results by county

See also 
United States elections, 1962
United States Senate elections, 1962

Notes

References 

Alabama
1962
1962 Alabama elections